Rahul Dholakia is an Indian film director-producer-screenwriter, most known for his National Film Award-winning film, Parzania   (Heaven & Hell On Earth) (2005), prior to which he also made documentaries like Teenage Parents and New York Taxi Drivers.

Early life and education
Born in Mumbai, to Raksha and Parry Dholakia, an advertising professional, Rahul also has an elder sister Moha. After completing his schooling from Campion School, Mumbai and Jamnabai Narsee School in Mumbai, he went on to do his Bachelors in Science from St. Xavier's College, Mumbai. He is an Indian.

Career
While still in college he started working in his father's advertising agency, Mora Ava. He also worked with producer Babla Sen, for project for Channel 4, London, as production assistant and 10 documentaries later became a producer himself. Later, he started working with Everest Advertising in Mumbai as an assistant, growing up to become a producer.

Thereafter, he moved to New York City in 1990, where, he did his master's degree in filmmaking from the New York Institute of Technology, and has been in India and Corona, California, United States ever since. After making a couple of documentaries and commercials, and even running TV station, called 'TV Asia' for a while,<ref>Parzania director: 2006's National award winner Rediff.com, 30 August 2006.</ref> he made his feature film debut with the Hindi-English bilingual, Kehtaa Hai Dil Baar Baar (2002), starring Paresh Rawal and Jimmy Shergill. His next film based on a real-life story of 10-year-old Parsi boy, Azhar Mody, known as Parzan, who disappeared during the 28 February 2002 Gulbarg Society massacre, which took place during communal riots in Gujarat in 2002, Parzania won him the National Film Award for 2006.

After shooting in Kashmir, his next film Lamhaa'', where Sanjay Dutt and Bipasha Basu played the leads in a story based in Kashmir, was released to mixed reviews.
he has directed the film Raees, which was released on 25 January 2017 and received positive reviews.

Filmography

Awards and honours

References

External links

 http://www.rahuldholakia.com/

 Rahul Dholakia at Allmovie.

Living people
Year of birth missing (living people)
St. Xavier's College, Mumbai alumni
21st-century Indian film directors
Film producers from Mumbai
Indian male screenwriters
Hindi-language film directors
Indian documentary filmmakers
Best Director National Film Award winners
Film directors from Mumbai
New York Institute of Technology alumni
Gujarati people